Neorrhyncha is a genus of moths belonging to the subfamily Olethreutinae of the family Tortricidae.

Species
Neorrhyncha angina Razowski & Wojtusiak, 2012
Neorrhyncha bendelana Razowski & Wojtusial, 2012
Neorrhyncha camerunica Aarvik, 2004
Neorrhyncha congolana Aarvik, 2004
Neorrhyncha gestroa Razowski & Wojtusial, 2012

See also
List of Tortricidae genera

References

 , 2004: Revision of the subtribe Neopotamiae (Lepidoptera: Tortricidae) in Africa. Norwegian Journal of Entomology 51 (1): 71-122.
 , 2005: World catalogue of insects volume 5 Tortricidae.
 , 2012: Tortricidae (Lepidoptera) from Nigeria. Acta Zoologica Cracoviensia 55 (2): 59-130. Full article: .

External links
tortricidae.com

Olethreutini
Tortricidae genera